Saint-Sulpice-des-Landes may refer to two communes in France:

 Saint-Sulpice-des-Landes, Ille-et-Vilaine, in the Ille-et-Vilaine département 
 Saint-Sulpice-des-Landes, Loire-Atlantique, in the Loire-Atlantique  département